The 1996 Nobel Prize in Literature was awarded to the Polish poet Wisława Szymborska (1923–2012) "for poetry that with ironic precision allows the historical and biological context to come to light in fragments of human reality." Szymborska is the 9th female recipient and the 5th Nobel laureate from Poland after Czesław Miłosz in 1980

Laureate

Wisława Szymborska's poetry addressed existential questions. In her poems, she employs literary devices such as ironic precision, paradox, contradiction, and understatement to illuminate philosophical themes and obsessions. She weaves in the machinery of eternity in a momentary experience of the here and now. Her poetry is characterized by a simplified, "personal" language that is unlike contemporary language, often with a little twist at the end, with a striking combination of spirituality, ingenuity, and empathy. Many of her poems feature war and terrorism. Among her well-known collections include Dlatego żyjemy ("That's Why We Are All Alive", 1952), Pytania zadawane sobie ("Questioning Yourself", 1954), Ludzie na moście ("People on the Bridge", 1986), Koniec i początek ("The End and the Beginning", 1993), and Widok z ziarnkiem piasku ("View with a Grain of Sand", 1996).

Reactions
The choice of Szymborska was seen as a surprise by many observers who had expected a novelist to win the prize as the previous years prize had been awarded to the Irish poet Seamus Heaney. The exiled Chinese poet Bei Dao was also a favourite to win the prize. “She has gone through a long evolution and has reached maturity,” said the Polish poet Czeslaw Milosz, who was awarded the Nobel Prize in 1980. “Polish poetry in the 20th century has reached a strong international position on the European continent. Szymborska represents it well.”

Nobel lecture
Szymborska delivered her Nobel lecture entitled The Poet and the World in the Polish language on December 7, 1996 at the Swedish Academy. During the Nobel banquet, on December 20, she expressed a short speech of gratitude, saying:

References

External links
1996 Press release nobelprize.org
Award ceremony speech nobelprize.org

1996